Miniac-sous-Bécherel (literally Miniac under Bécherel; ; Gallo: Meinyac) is a commune in the Ille-et-Vilaine department in Brittany in northwestern France.

Population
Inhabitants of Miniac-sous-Bécherel are called Miniaçois in French.

See also
Communes of the Ille-et-Vilaine department

References

External links

Mayors of Ille-et-Vilaine Association 

Communes of Ille-et-Vilaine